The Unha or Eunha ("Galaxy") is a North Korean expendable carrier rocket, which partially utilizes the same delivery system as the Taepodong-2 orbital launch system.

History 
North Korea's first orbital space launch attempt occurred on August 31, 1998, and was unsuccessful. This launch attempt was performed by a Paektusan-1 rocket, which used a solid motor third stage, a Scud-missile-based second stage, and a Nodong-1 based first stage. Nodong-1 was a North Korean-developed stage thought to be a scale-up of the old Soviet Scud missile.

Vehicle description 

The Unha's first stage consists of four clustered Nodong motors, which themselves are enlarged Scud motors. The second stage was initially thought to be based on the SS-N-6, although it, too, is now believed to be based on Scud technology. The third and last stage might be identical to the Iranian Safir's second stage which is propelled by two small gimballed motors.

Recent satellite images of the Sohae Satellite Launching Station showing an enlarged launch tower under construction indicate that an enlarged version, called Unha-X, might be under development, coupled with a North Korean propaganda poster showing such a vehicle.

Launch history
On 24 February 2009, North Korea announced that a Unha rocket would be used to launch the Kwangmyŏngsŏng-2 satellite. According to the South Korean government, the launch took place on 5 April from the Tonghae Satellite Launching Ground in Hwadae county. Several countries, including South Korea, the U.S., and Japan, voiced concerns that the launch would violate United Nations Security Council Resolution 1718 which prohibits North Korea from testing ballistic missiles. Russia also announced they urged North Korea to refrain from its planned rocket launch.

On April 5, 2009, the Unha-2 rocket was launched at around 02:30 hours UTC (11:30 hours KST). The U.S. Northern Command said that the first stage of the rocket fell into the Sea of Japan (East Sea of Korea), while the other rocket stages as well as the payload fell into the Pacific Ocean, and no object entered orbit. Later analysis indicated the rocket impacted  from the launch site, and that the second stage operated normally but the rocket's third stage failed to separate properly. North Korea maintains that the rocket successfully put its payload in orbit.

On December 12, 2012, the Unha-3 Unit-2 rocket was launched at 00:49 UTC (7:49 EST). The U.S. Northern Command said that the first stage of the rocket fell into the Yellow Sea, while the debris of the second stage was assessed to have fallen into the Philippine Sea and confirmed that the satellite had entered orbit.

See also
 Comparison of orbital launchers families
 Timeline of first orbital launches by country
 Naro-1
 Simorgh (rocket)

References

External links 

"An Analysis of North Korea’s Unha-2 Launch Vehicle,"  David Wright, March 20, 2009.
Robert S. Norris and Hans M. Kristensen, "Nuclear Notebook: North Korea’s nuclear program, 2005", "Bulletin of the Atomic Scientists", May/June 2005.

Space launch vehicles of North Korea
Expendable space launch systems
Vehicles introduced in 2009